Aamir Atlas Khan (born 30 July 1990 in Peshawar) is a Pakistani professional squash player and recipient of Pakistan highest civil award ( Tamgha-I-Imtiaz ). He is the nephew of former world champion, Jansher Khan.

Career
2007 has been Khan's most successful year and has seen his rankings rise. He was a finalist in the Governor NWFP International 2007 and in the President PSF international 2007, but in both occasions he was beaten by Mansoor Zaman. In August, he went one step better by winning his first title at the CAS international, beating Malaysian Mohd Azlan Iskandar.

As of 2009, Aamir, who turned pro in 2002 is ranked 14th, his highest ranking, and is the current No. 1 Pakistan squash player.

2010
Khan won a silver medal in the individual event at the 2010 Asian Games in Guangzhou, China.

Asian Squash Championship '13

In the Asian Squash Championship 2013, Khan brushed aside Kuwait's Abdullah Al Mezayan in three sets to become the first Pakistani in 14 years to claim the title.

References
 4. https://www.telegraph.co.uk/sport/othersports/squash/6617389/Pakistans-Aamir-Atlas-Khan-shocks-Gregory-Gaultier-at-Qatar-Open.html

External links
 
 
 

1990 births
Living people
Pakistani male squash players
Commonwealth Games competitors for Pakistan
Squash players at the 2010 Commonwealth Games
Asian Games gold medalists for Pakistan
Asian Games silver medalists for Pakistan
Asian Games medalists in squash
Squash players at the 2006 Asian Games
Squash players at the 2010 Asian Games
Medalists at the 2010 Asian Games
Racket sportspeople from Peshawar
Pashtun people